The 2020 AFC Champions League was the 39th edition of Asia's premier club football tournament organized by the Asian Football Confederation (AFC), and the 18th under the current AFC Champions League title.

Ulsan Hyundai won their second Champions League title by defeating Persepolis 2–1 in the final. Ulsan automatically qualify for the 2021 AFC Champions League (although they had already qualified through their domestic performance), the first time since 2008 that the AFC Champions League holders were guaranteed automatic qualification in the following year. They also earned the right to play in the 2020 FIFA Club World Cup in Qatar.

The tournament was the last to involve 32 teams during the group stage, which increased to 40 teams in 2021.

The competition was suspended due to the COVID-19 pandemic in Asia after group stage matches on 4 March 2020, and restarted on 14 September 2020. All matches after the restart were played in Qatar, with the final played at the Al Janoub Stadium.

Al-Hilal of Saudi Arabia were the defending champions, but the club effectively withdrew from the competition when they could not name the required 13 players for their final group stage match, as all but 11 players had tested positive for COVID-19. For the first time, the video assistant referee (VAR) system was in use from the quarter-finals onwards.

Association team allocation
The 46 AFC member associations (excluding the associate member Northern Mariana Islands) were ranked based on their national team's and clubs' performance over the last four years in AFC competitions, with the allocation of slots for the 2019 and 2020 editions of the AFC club competitions determined by the 2017 AFC rankings (Entry Manual Article 2.3):
The associations were split into two regions:
West Region consisted of the associations from the West Asian Football Federation (WAFF), the Central Asian Football Association (CAFA), and the South Asian Football Federation (SAFF).
East Region consisted of the associations from the ASEAN Football Federation (AFF) and the East Asian Football Federation (EAFF).
In each region, there were four groups in the group stage, including a total of 12 direct slots, with the 4 remaining slots filled through play-offs.
The top 12 associations in each region as per the AFC rankings were eligible to enter the AFC Champions League, as long as they fulfilled the AFC Champions League criteria.
The top six associations in each region got at least one direct slot in the group stage, while the remaining associations got only play-off slots (as well as AFC Cup group stage slots):
The associations ranked 1st and 2nd each got three direct slots and one play-off slot.
The associations ranked 3rd and 4th each got two direct slots and two play-off slots.
The associations ranked 5th each got one direct slot and two play-off slots.
The associations ranked 6th each got one direct slot and one play-off slot.
The associations ranked 7th to 12th each got one play-off slot.
The maximum number of slots for each association was one-third of the total number of eligible teams in the top division.
If any association gave up its direct slots, they were redistributed to the highest eligible association, with each association limited to a maximum of three direct slots.
If any association gave up its play-off slots, they were annulled and not redistributed to any other association.

Association ranking
For the 2020 AFC Champions League, the associations were allocated slots according to their association ranking which was published on 15 December 2017, which took into account their performance in the AFC Champions League and the AFC Cup, as well as their national team's FIFA World Rankings, during the period between 2014 and 2017.

Notes

Teams
The following 52 teams from 23 associations entered the competition.

In the following table, the number of appearances and last appearance count only those since the 2002–03 season (including qualifying rounds), when the competition was rebranded as the AFC Champions League.

Notes

Schedule
The schedule of the competition was as follows. Due to the COVID-19 pandemic, only some of the group stage matches on matchdays 1–3 in February and March were played as scheduled, and all matches on matchdays 4–6 were postponed until further notice. The round of 16, quarter-finals and semi-finals were also initially moved to 10–12 and 24–26 August, 14–16 and 28–30 September, and 20–21 and 27–28 October.

The AFC announced the calendar of the remaining matches on 9 July 2020, with all matches before the final played at centralised venues, and all knockout ties played as a single match. On 10 September 2020, the AFC announced the new dates for the East Region matches and the final.

Notes:
W: West Region
E: East Region
Italics: new dates after restart

The original schedule of the competition, as planned before the pandemic, was as follows.

Qualifying play-offs

Preliminary round 1

Preliminary round 2

Play-off round

Group stage

Group A

Group B

Group C

Group D

Group E

Group F

Group G

Group H

Knockout stage

Bracket

Round of 16

Quarter-finals

Semi-finals

Final

Awards

Main awards

Note: Abderrazak Hamdallah finished ahead of Júnior Negrão to win the Top Scorer award despite scoring the same number of goals, and also having the same number of assists (first tiebreaker), since he played fewer minutes throughout the competition (second tiebreaker).

All Star Squad
Source:

Opta Best XI
Source:

Fans' awards
The AFC took polls of fans in its website after the tournament.

Statistics

Statistical leaders

Top scorers

Toyota Player of the Week awards

See also
2020 AFC Cup

References

External links
, the-AFC.com
AFC Champions League 2020, stats.the-AFC.com

 
1
2020
Association football events postponed due to the COVID-19 pandemic